Sandra Levinson is the executive director and co-founder of the nonprofit Center for Cuban Studies, and the founder and curator of the Cuban Art Space gallery.

Early life and education
Sandra Levinson is from Mason City, Iowa. She graduated from the University of Iowa and attended the University of Manchester as a Fulbright scholar and Stanford University for her masters and doctorate. In 1966, she was the New York Editor for Ramparts, as well as a political science instructor at City College of New York, and residing in Greenwich Village. She was an SDS activist as well as a reporter for Ramparts, and in July 1969, she visited Cuba as part of a group of journalists, including Peter Jennings, and met with Fidel Castro.

Writing career
With Carol Brightman, Levinson co-edited the 1971 book Venceremos Brigade: Young Americans Sharing the Life and Work of Revolutionary Cuba, a collection of writings by a group of volunteers from the United States who cut sugarcane in Cuba, known as the Venceremos Brigade; according to Kirkus Reviews, "Running through all the narratives is the preoccupation with the need to be relevant to 'the revolution' as well as a conscientious emphasis on eradicating vestiges of their own bourgeois individualism". In a review for The American Political Science Review, Patricia W. Fagen writes, "The editors' introduction explains the formulation and organization of the Brigades, and provides a useful and thoughtful analysis of the Brigades' importance to the American left."

Levinson is also a co-editor of the 1979 book The U.S. Blockade: A Documentary History, published by the Center for Cuban Studies, and her writing is published in several collections: The Cuba Reader: The Making of a Revolutionary Society, A Contemporary Cuba Reader: The Revolution under Raúl Castro, and The Cuba Reader: History, Culture, Politics.

Center for Cuban Studies
In May 1972, Levinson co-founded the Center for Cuban Studies (CCS) as a nonprofit educational organization with Saul Landau and Lee Lockwood. The mission of the organization includes opposition to the United States embargo against Cuba and support for the normalization of relations through educational programs, including tours to Cuba. In March 1973, while Levinson was working as the director at the CCS office in Greenwich Village, a bomb denotated in the building. Despite extensive property damage, no one was injured, and Levinson continued to lead the CCS. In 2007, she recalled, "Instead of making me leave, it only made me more furious". 

In 1984, Levinson spoke with the Wall Street Journal about the impact of the embargo on the Cuban economy, stating, "The old cars are the most obvious sign. It's the same with the factories. The whole phone system is obsolete. You can hardly find a copying machine, and when you do it probably doesn't work because they can't get the spare parts they need." In 1995, she advocated for businesses in the United States to oppose the economic embargo of Cuba, and told The Oregonian, "It was businesspeople who brought about the ending of the embargo in Vietnam," and "If businesspeople really get behind ending the embargo in Cuba, it will happen." In 2013, Levinson told The Atlantic, "We should be thinking about the embargo in terms of U.S. citizens' rights to travel where they want".

Cuba tours
In 1973, the CCS began sponsoring tours to Cuba. Initially, the CCS coordinated educational trips to Cuba from the United States for academics, which helped overcome travel restrictions imposed by the United States and Cuba. As travel restrictions eased under the Obama administration to include "people-to-people" visits that allow organizations to sponsor individuals for educational visits, more travel programs were able to be developed by the CCS.

Cuban Art Space
In 1991, Levinson was a plaintiff in a successful lawsuit by the National Emergency Civil Liberties Committee against the United States Treasury Department and Office of Foreign Assets Control, seeking to decriminalize the importation of Cuban art. In 1999, she founded the Cuban Art Space art gallery as part of the CCS, with regular exhibitions, and by 2016, its collection included over 10,000 Cuban works of art, including sculpture and paintings, with most of the collection imported directly by Levinson. CCS also developed the Lourdes Casal Library, which by 2007, held a collection of post-1959 materials from Cuba, including books, magazines, and newspapers.

Works

Personal life
Levinson has visited Cuba more than 300 times. During her time in Cuba, she learned to dance.

References

External links 
 Bombing: Center for Cuban Studies (Center for Cuban Studies, The New York Review of Books, July 19, 1973)	
 In Conversation: Sandra Levinson, a Pioneer of Cuban Art in the US (Cuban Art News, July 5, 2016) 

People from Iowa
University of Iowa alumni
Alumni of the University of Manchester
Stanford University alumni
20th-century American women writers
American activists
20th-century American women educators
20th-century American educators
Nonprofit chief executives
American curators
21st-century American non-fiction writers
21st-century American women writers
20th-century American journalists
20th-century American non-fiction writers
Year of birth missing (living people)
Living people